NetSolve was an information technology company based in the United States. It was acquired by Cisco Systems on September 9, 2004.

Netsolve, Inc was a 1995 renaming of an Austin, Texas-based company Southwest Network Services, Inc. Netsolve's primary product was IP and frame-relay network management and consultation, and the company was centered on a mid-sized call center and engineering team. Netsolve's larger clients included Cisco and AT&T.

Southwest Network Services (SNS) was a nationwide data communications carrier which began in late 1991. The SNS network was a circuit-switched network consisting of DSC Communications CP4000 and CS1 DCSs (digital cross-connect systems) in many major U.S. cities, as well as smaller cities in Texas. During the early nineties SNS carried subrate (< DS0) modem and DDS traffic, and eventually scaled to DS0, fractional T-1 and T1 products. In 1994, SNS deployed a small frame-relay network consisting of Cascade Communications STDX-3000s, 6000s, and 9000s. The entire carrier network was sold by Netsolve to ICI Communications of Orlando, Florida in early 1996. ICI was later bought by MCI Communications.

SNS additionally sold networking equipment, beginning with Micom and Penril multiplexers. Eventually, SNS sold 3Com, Wellfleet, and finally, Cisco equipment. Netsolve ended this service in 2003.

Defunct software companies of the United States
Cisco Systems acquisitions
Companies based in Austin, Texas